"Megamix" is a song by Belgian Eurodance group Technotronic. It was released as a single in September 1990 and comprises the four previous singles taken from their first studio album, Pump Up the Jam: The Album. The songs featured in the megamix, in order, are "This Beat Is Technotronic", "Get Up! (Before the Night Is Over)", "Rockin' Over the Beat", "Pump Up the Jam", "Special Unity Break", "Move This" (in the club mix only), "Get Up! (Before the Night Is Over)", "This Beat Is Technotronic", and "Pump Up the Jam (US Mix)".

"Megamix" peaked within the top 10 in Belgium, Denmark, Finland, France, Ireland, Switzerland, the United Kingdom, and West Germany. The song is included on European release of their 1990 remix album Trip on This: The Remixes, and their 1993 compilation album The Greatest Hits.

Track listings
 7-inch single
A. Megamix (radio version)  - 4:18
B. Raw Update  (remix)  – 3:20
 
 CD maxi (BCM Records [20475])
 Megamix (club version)  – 7:22	
 Megamix (radio version)  - 4:18
 Raw Update  (remix)  – 5:09
 Come On (remix)  – 3:12

Charts

Weekly charts

Year end charts

References

1990 singles
1990 songs
EMI Records singles
English-language Belgian songs
SBK Records singles
Songs written by Jo Bogaert
Technotronic songs